Taiwan Beer may be:

 A brand of beer, Taiwan Beer, produced by the Taiwan Tobacco and Liquor Corporation
 Beer in Taiwan
 Taiwan Beer (basketball), a Super Basketball League basketball team sponsored by the Taiwan Tobacco and Liquor Corporation